František "Frank" Lukeš (born September 25, 1982) is a Czech professional ice hockey player currently under contract to HC Litvínov of the Czech Extraliga (Czech).  He was originally selected by the Phoenix Coyotes in the 8th round (243rd overall) of the 2001 NHL Entry Draft.

Lukeš has played with HC Litvínov in the Czech Extraliga since the 2006–07 Czech Extraliga season.

Career statistics

Regular season and playoffs

International

References

External links 
 

1982 births
Living people
Czech ice hockey right wingers
HC Litvínov players
Idaho Steelheads (ECHL) players
Laredo Bucks players
Arizona Coyotes draft picks
San Antonio Rampage players
Springfield Falcons players
Toronto St. Michael's Majors players
Utah Grizzlies (AHL) players
People from Kadaň
Sportspeople from the Ústí nad Labem Region
Czech expatriate ice hockey players in Canada
Czech expatriate ice hockey players in the United States